"Tell It Like It T-I-Is" is a song by American new wave band the B-52's from their sixth studio album, Good Stuff (1992). It was issued as the album's third single on August 31, 1992. This song reached number 61 on the UK Singles Chart and number 13 on the US Billboard Modern Rock Tracks chart.

Charts

References

The B-52's songs
1992 singles
1992 songs
Reprise Records singles
Song recordings produced by Nile Rodgers
Songs written by Fred Schneider
Songs written by Kate Pierson
Songs written by Keith Strickland